D Magazine is a monthly magazine covering Dallas–Fort Worth. It is headquartered in Downtown Dallas.

D Magazine covers a range of topics including politics, business, food, fashion and lifestyle in the city of Dallas.  The first issue was published in October 1974 by its founders, Wick Allison and Jim Atkinson.

History
D Magazine was founded in 1974 by two University of Texas graduates, Wick Allison and Jim Atkinson. Both had a vision of giving Dallas an independent city magazine with an impact that would serve readers’ interests. They developed their concept after-hours while Allison, a Dallas native, attended graduate school at Southern Methodist University and Atkinson reported on KERA’s daily Newsroom program. Their vision was backed financially by young Dallas business people who shared their belief in the need for a strong city magazine.

The magazine received an early boost from Neiman Marcus founder Stanley Marcus, who sent a letter to 200,000 Neiman Marcus cardholders in the Dallas area, urging them to subscribe to the new magazine. It is a member of the City and Regional Magazine Association (CRMA).

The magazine was not well received by everyone. In 1975 then-mayor Wes Wise sued the magazine for libel. That same year the Dallas Restaurant Association sent a letter to its members urging an advertising boycott of the magazine because of its critical dining reviews. In 1990, American Express purchased the magazine, but the new ownership was not successful. In 1996, original founder Wick Allison repurchased the magazine with a group of investors, and in 2003 became the sole owner.

The editors and staff writers of D also publish FrontBurner, a blog about things relating to Dallas. In 2000, Allison launched a sister magazine, D Home, for the home furnishings industry, and in 2003 a magazine for local brides called D Weddings. By 2007 there were five more magazines under the D brand, serving various communities of interest, as well as nine associated community weeklies serving affluent neighborhoods in Dallas.

In 2008, D Magazine laid off 19% of its staff and closed three of its newspapers due to shrinking revenue from advertising. The magazine laid off an additional 12% of its staff in 2009.

D Magazine Partners also publishes D Home, D CEO, Dallas/Fort Worth Medical Directory, D Weddings, Private School Handbook, and Dmagazine.com, a daily resource for best restaurants in Dallas, recommendations for things to do, local news, and commentary on life in Dallas.

"Pay to play" accusation 
In 2021, former Texas state representative Matt Rinaldi criticized the magazine, telling The Dallas Express that D Magazine's "Best" series is a "pay-to-play" advertising sales scheme. The series showcases business leaders and lawyers as being top in their field. Rinaldi characterized the series as "is a scam and exists solely to sell advertising to those who get themselves listed in it."

Awards and nominations

References

External links

 
 Front Burner, blog

1974 establishments in Texas
City guides
Lifestyle magazines published in the United States
Local interest magazines published in the United States
Magazines established in 1974
Magazines published in Texas
Mass media in Dallas
Monthly magazines published in the United States